Tourista may refer to:
 Travelers' diarrhea
 
 Tourista (rock)